The Red Tent (translit. Krasnaya palatka;  is a joint Soviet/Italian 1969 film directed by Mikhail Kalatozov.

The film is based on the story of the 1928 mission to rescue Umberto Nobile and the other survivors of the crash of the airship Italia. It features Sean Connery as Roald Amundsen and Peter Finch as Nobile. The script was adapted by Yuri Nagibin and Mikhail Kalatozov from Nagibin's novel of the same title. Nagibin couldn't complete the script due to a series of conflicts with the producer, who insisted on expanding the role of his paramour Claudia Cardinale, and it was completed by de Concini and Bolt.

Plot
The film begins in Rome many years after the expedition. Nobile has endured years of scorn for his actions during the disaster and its aftermath. He imagines his apartment turned into a court of inquiry against him, where witnesses and judges are his former crewmen – including Captain Zappi, his navigator and his meteorologist Finn Malmgren. Also arrayed against him are Valeria, Malmgren's lover, Captain Romagna, one of the expedition's would-be rescuers, famed aviator Lundborg, professor Samoilovich, chief of the Soviet rescue mission, his pilot Boris Chukhnovsky, and Roald Amundsen, who died in the search for survivors of Nobile's expedition.

As they try Nobile, the events of the expedition and its failure are depicted. The expedition is successful at first, but ends in disaster. The Italia is weighed down when ice forms on it. Colliding with the ground, the airship's gondola is torn away from its keel and the envelope containing the airship's hydrogen cells; freed of the weight of the gondola, the rest of the ship floats away and out of control, taking some of Nobile's crew with it.

Nobile maintains control of the surviving crew who are now marooned on arctic pack ice with some salvaged supplies. They shelter in a tent that they dye red for visibility. They are able to repair the radio, but after receiving no response to their distress calls, three of the survivors (Zappi, Mariano, and Malmgren) decide to set off across the ice to seek help. The survivors' distress signal is picked up by a Russian radio operator, and the Soviet Union sends the icebreaker Krassin to their rescue. Unfortunately, the ship sustains damage en route. Nobile's group is first found by Lundborg, a Swedish pilot who lands on the ice. The aviator insists he can only take Nobile. Reluctantly, Nobile agrees, believing that he can best assist the rescue from Kings Bay. These efforts are blocked: Nobile receives word that his superiors in Rome have stripped him of command for apparently abandoning his crew, and he is ordered confined to his room and to have no role in the rescue. Desperate, Nobile contacts Prof. Samoilovich to implore him to resume the search for the survivors.

Amundsen joins the rescue effort as well, but disappears, becoming another victim of Nobile's expedition. In Nobile's vision, Amundsen explains that he died soon after his plane was blown off-course. Flying far to the North, Amundsen's party finds the wreckage of the Italia, spotting what appeared to be survivors. Amundsen orders his pilot, René Guilbaud, to land. Instead, the plane crashes, with Amundsen the sole survivor. On inspecting the wreck, Amundsen realizes that he is doomed, finding nothing to build shelter or fire with, no supplies and no hope of rescue. The men who had appeared to be survivors when seen from the air were already long dead.

The group who left on foot encounter difficulties, and are forced to leave Malmgren to die. Back at camp, the ice begins to break apart, and the survivors there barely escape from the gondola before it sinks. Alone on the ice, Nobile's survivors find themselves at their bleakest point before finally spotting the Krassin on the horizon. As the ship nears for a rescue, the survivors see Zappi and Mariano waving at them from its deck.

Pressed for a vote, Samoilovich defends Nobile's actions, noting that his rescue of the survivors was a direct result of Nobile's escape to King's Bay. Neither can he fault Nobile's apparent lack of heroism because a captain has no right to risk his own safety by individual acts of heroism. The others quickly reach a verdict of guilty, but Amundsen discounts the verdict, finding each of the accusers unfit to judge for various reasons, including indifference to others and emotional sterility, but mostly for their bitterness. The accusers file out of Nobile's apartment, Amundsen being the last. With Amundsen, Nobile reveals his feelings of guilt for leaving the men on the ice. While Nobile admits that his decision to join Lundborg was based on a number of reasons, some correct while others were wrong, his first thoughts on entering Lundborg's plane were not of rescue, but of a good hot bath. Amundsen helps Nobile find peace by reminding him that his frailty is only a sign of humanity and not guilt.

Cast 
 Peter Finch as Gen. Umberto Nobile
 Sean Connery as Dr. Roald Amundsen
 Claudia Cardinale as Nurse Valeria
 Hardy Krüger as Lt. Einar Lundborg
 Massimo Girotti as Capt. Romagna, rescue mission coordinator
 Otar Koberidze as Cichony
 Luigi Vannucchi as Capt. Zappi
 Mario Adorf as Sgt. Biagi, radio operator
 Eduard Martsevich as Dr. Finn Malmgren, meteorologist officer
 Grigori Gai as Prof. Rudolf Samoilovich, Chief of the Russian rescue expedition 
 Nikita Mikhalkov as Boris Chukhnovsky, Russian aviator
 Nikolai Ivanov as Kolka Schmidt, Russian radio amateur
 Boris Khmelnitsky as Viglieri
Yury Solomin as Trojani
 Yuri Vizbor as František Běhounek
 Donatas Banionis as Adalberto Mariano

Production
The film was made with the approval of Nobile. Nobile said of Finch's casting, "I don't know if he looks like me. But if he reads my books and gets into the spirit of the thing, I'm sure he'll give a splendid interpretation."

Russia provided 60% of the budget, Italy (via producer Franco Cristaldi) 40%.

Filming went for 62 weeks. It included location work in the Estonian Soviet Socialist Republic, the Baltic Sea and the Svalbard Archipelago in the Arctic Ocean, and studio work in Moscow and Rome. Shooting was completed on 12 April 1969. Paramount picked up the US distribution rights. Robert Bolt did the final draft of the script.

The international version of the film features original music by Ennio Morricone, with Dino Asciolla as viola soloist and Bruno Nicolai as the conductor.

Reception

Critical response
The Red Tent has an approval rating of 88% on review aggregator website Rotten Tomatoes, based on 8 reviews, and an average rating of 7.64/10.

Awards
The film was nominated for 1972 Golden Globe Award for Best English-Language Foreign Film.

References

External links
 
 

1969 drama films
1969 films
1969 in the Soviet Union
1960s adventure drama films
1960s multilingual films
Cultural depictions of Roald Amundsen
English-language Italian films
English-language Soviet films
Films about aviation accidents or incidents
Italian films based on actual events
Films based on works by Yuri Nagibin
Films directed by Mikhail Kalatozov
Films scored by Aleksandr Zatsepin
Films scored by Ennio Morricone
Films set in 1928
Films set in the Arctic
Films shot in the Arctic
Films shot in Estonia
Films shot in Moscow
Films shot in Norway
Films shot in Rome
Films with screenplays by Robert Bolt
Italian aviation films
Italian multilingual films
Mosfilm films
Soviet multilingual films
1960s Italian films